Josefina Isabel Villalobos Páramo (born August 5, 1924) is an American-born Colombian-Ecuadorian public servant. She was the First Lady of Ecuador serving from August 10, 1992 through August 10, 1996 when her husband, Sixto Durán Ballén, served as President of Ecuador.

Early life
Villalobos was born in New York City to Colombian parents. In 1945, she married Sixto Durán Ballén.

First Lady (1992–1996)
As the first lady of the nation, Villalobos was known in the media and by the Ecuadorian people Finita de Durán-Ballén. She was known for hosting of Carondelet Palace and accompanying her husband in various trips nationally and internationally. Josefina was the first older lady to assume the role, since she was 68 years old when her husband won the presidency of the Republic in 1992.

Personal life
Ballén and Villalobos had eight children. After Ballén left office, the two retired and lived in Quito, Ecuador. On November 15, 2016, Ballén died at the age of 95.

References

External links

 
 
 

1924 births
Living people
First ladies of Ecuador
Colombian emigrants to Ecuador
People from New York City
Colombian expatriates in the United States
21st-century Ecuadorian women